The 10th constituency of Seine-et-Marne is a French legislative constituency in the Seine-et-Marne département.

Description

The 10th constituency of Seine-et-Marne was created as a result of the 2010 redistricting of French legislative constituencies in which Seine-et-Marne gained two additional constituencies. The seat is a combination of territory from the old 7th and 8th constituencies. It is a relatively compact seat which contains much of the Marne-la-Vallée new town.

The seat was won comfortably by Émeric Bréhier of the PS at its first election in 2012. It was then taken by Stéphanie Do of LREM in the 2017 election. In the 2022 election, Do lost the seat to Maxime Laisney of LFI in a repeat of the second round of the previous election.

Historic Representation

Election results

2022

 
 
 
 
 
 
 
|-
| colspan="8" bgcolor="#E9E9E9"|
|-

2017

 
 
 
 
 
 
 
 
|-
| colspan="8" bgcolor="#E9E9E9"|
|-

2012

Sources
Official results of French elections from 2002: "Résultats électoraux officiels en France" (in French).

10